Litoribaculum is a Gram-negative , moderately halotolerant and strictly aerobic genus of bacteria from the family of Flavobacteriaceae with one known species (Litoribaculum gwangyangense). Litoribaculum gwangyangense has been isolated from tidal flat from South Korea.

References

Flavobacteria
Bacteria genera
Monotypic bacteria genera
Taxa described in 2015